Olu'bo may refer to:
the Olu'bo people
the Olu'bo language